Theodore ("Ted") Robert Dudley (1936–1994) was an American botanist, who died prematurely of a brain tumor.

Education & Career 
Ted attended the University of Edinburgh, where he obtained a Ph.D. with the thesis "Taxonomic studies in the Cruciferae of the Near East". He worked at the Arnold Arboretum at Harvard University from 1956 until joining the United States National Arboretum in 1966 where he was a taxonomist and Curator of the herbarium.

He was an authority on the holly genus (Ilex) as well as Viburnum and Alyssum.

Collections 
The majority of Ted's collections are housed at the United States National Arboretum Herbarium with other collections distributed around the world at institutions like the University of Reading Herbarium, the Harvard University Herbaria, and the Instituto de Botánica Darwinion de Buenos Aires.

He collected extensively in Argentina, and the Antarctic, and also Turkey, Greece, Peru, Korea, and China. Many of the collections from his expeditions were new to science and were sometimes named in his honor (for example, Masdevallia dudleyi Luer).

Honors 
Marshall Scholarship

References

Sources 
 University of Reading Plant Sciences: Theodore, Robert Dudley 
 Harvard Botanist Index: Theodore Robert Dudley

20th-century American botanists
1936 births
1994 deaths